Duke of Saint-Aignan (Fr.: duc de Saint-Aignan) was a title of nobility in the peerage of France created by Louis XIV of France for François de Beauvilliers in 1663.  It takes its name from Beauvilliers' hometown of Saint-Aignan (which is close to Blois).

List of Dukes of Saint-Aignan, 1663—1828

References
Profile of Saint-Aignan 

1663 establishments in France